Harry Elmo "Speed" Else (January 9, 1906 – December 28, 1986) was an American baseball catcher and pitcher in the Negro leagues. He played from 1932 to 1940 with several teams, including the Kansas City Monarchs and the Chicago American Giants. He played for the West in the 1936 East-West All-Star Game.

References

External links
 and Baseball-Reference Black Baseball stats and Seamheads

1906 births
1986 deaths
Chicago American Giants players
Kansas City Monarchs players
Monroe Monarchs players
New Orleans Crescent Stars players
Baseball players from Texas
People from Terrell, Texas
20th-century African-American sportspeople
Baseball pitchers